The Uruguay Billie Jean King Cup team represents Uruguay in the Billie Jean King Cup tennis competition and are governed by the Asociación Uruguaya de Tenis.  They currently compete in the Americas Zone Group II.

History
Uruguay competed in its first Fed Cup in 1972.  Their best result was reaching the round of 16 in 1972 and 1976.

See also
Fed Cup
Uruguay Davis Cup team

External links

Billie Jean King Cup teams
Fed Cup
Fed Cup